This article lists the confirmed national futsal squads for the 1996 FIFA Futsal World Championship tournament held in Spain, between 24 November and 8 December 1996.

Group A

Head coach: Javier Lozano Cid

Head coach: Gennadiy Lisenchuk

Head coach: Farouk El Sayed

Head coach: James Roberts

Group B

Head coach: Ron Groenewoud

Head coach: Semen ANDREEV

Head coach: Fernando LARRANAGA

Head coach: GENBAO Xu

Group C

Head coach: Carlo FACCHIN

Head coach: Rolando MUNIZ

Head coach: John KOWALSKI

Head coach: Vic Hermans

Group D

Head coach: Takão

Head coach: Damien KNABBEN

Head coach:Reza Mohammadkazemi

Head coach: Clemente REINOSO

External links
FIFA.com

FIFA Futsal World Cup squads
Squads